The 2003 NASCAR Craftsman Truck Series season was the ninth season of the third highest stock car racing in the United States. The season included twenty-five races, beginning with the Florida Dodge Dealers 250 at Daytona International Speedway and ending with the Ford 200 at Homestead-Miami Speedway. Steve Coulter won the Owners' Championship, while Travis Kvapil won the Drivers' Championship during the final race of the season at Homestead-Miami Speedway. Dodge won the Manufacturers' Championship with 179 points.

2003 teams and drivers

Full-time teams

Part-time teams
Note: If under "team", the owner's name is listed and in italics, that means the name of the race team that fielded the truck is unknown.

Notes

Races

Florida Dodge Dealers 250

The Florida Dodge Dealers 250 was held February 14 at Daytona International Speedway. Jason Leffler won the pole.

Top ten results

14-Rick Crawford
16-Travis Kvapil
59-Robert Pressley
4-Bobby Hamilton
15-Andy Houston
52-Mike Wallace
46-Dennis Setzer
50-Jon Wood
29-Terry Cook
62-Brendan Gaughan

Failed to qualify: Eric Jones (#34), Geoff Bodine (#36), Brian Rose (#57), Ricky Sanders (#19)

Craftsman 200

The Craftsman 200 was held March 14 at Darlington Raceway. Travis Kvapil won the pole.

Top ten results

4-Bobby Hamilton
1-Ted Musgrave
62-Brendan Gaughan
16-Travis Kvapil
18-Chad Chaffin
2-Jason Leffler
14-Rick Crawford
29-Terry Cook
75-David Starr
59-Robert Pressley

Failed to qualify: none

Lucas Oil 250 presented by Glidden

The Lucas Oil 250 presented by Glidden was held March 23 at Mesa Marin Raceway. Ted Musgrave won the pole.

Top ten results

46-Dennis Setzer
50-Jon Wood
62-Brendan Gaughan
4-Bobby Hamilton
1-Ted Musgrave
14-Rick Crawford
2-Jason Leffler
6-Brandon Miller
75-David Starr
29-Terry Cook

Failed to qualify: none

Advance Auto Parts 250

The Advance Auto Parts 250 was held April 12 at Martinsville Speedway. Ted Musgrave won the pole.

Top ten results

46-Dennis Setzer
1-Ted Musgrave
6-Kevin Harvick
99-Carl Edwards
4-Bobby Hamilton
14-Rick Crawford
17-Darrell Waltrip
9-Rich Bickle
29-Terry Cook
33-Andy Petree

Failed to qualify: Conrad Burr (#87), Tina Gordon (#31), Dana White (#23), James Stephenson (#36), Randy Briggs (#53), Doug Keller (#27), Craig Wood (#11), Jody McCormick (#77), Ron Polodna (#13)

Hardee's 200

The Hardee's 200 was held May 16 at Lowe's Motor Speedway. Bill Lester won the pole.

Top ten results

1-Ted Musgrave
62-Brendan Gaughan
14-Rick Crawford
16-Travis Kvapil
6-Kevin Harvick
07-Jeremy Mayfield
4-Bobby Hamilton
18-Chad Chaffin
88-Matt Crafton
15-Rich Bickle

Failed to qualify: Michael Dokken (#93), Phil Bonifield (#23)

MBNA Armed Forces Family 200

The MBNA Armed Forces Family 200 was held May 30 at Dover International Speedway. Bobby Hamilton won the pole.

Top ten results

2-Jason Leffler
4-Bobby Hamilton
75-David Starr
50-Jon Wood
16-Travis Kvapil
52-Ken Schrader
18-Chad Chaffin
14-Rick Crawford
46-Dennis Setzer
59-Robert Pressley

Failed to qualify: none

This was Jason Leffler's only Truck series victory.

O'Reilly 400K

The O'Reilly 400K was held June 6 at Texas Motor Speedway. Bobby Hamilton won the pole.

Top ten results

62-Brendan Gaughan
99-Carl Edwards
50-Jon Wood
16-Travis Kvapil
46-Dennis Setzer
75-David Starr
4-Bobby Hamilton
18-Chad Chaffin
29-Terry Cook
88-Matt Crafton

Failed to qualify: none

O'Reilly 200

The O'Reilly 200, the 200th race run in the truck series was held June 21 at Memphis Motorsports Park. Jon Wood won the pole.

Top ten results

1-Ted Musgrave
16-Travis Kvapil
46-Dennis Setzer
50-Jon Wood
99-Carl Edwards
2-Jason Leffler
4-Bobby Hamilton
62-Brendan Gaughan
29-Terry Cook
88-Matt Crafton

Failed to qualify: Stan Boyd (#51), Dennis Hannel (#94)

GNC 200

The GNC 200 was held June 28 at The Milwaukee Mile. Terry Cook won the pole.

Top ten results

62-Brendan Gaughan
2-Jason Leffler
14-Rick Crawford
1-Ted Musgrave
46-Dennis Setzer
16-Travis Kvapil
29-Terry Cook
75-Hank Parker Jr.
88-Matt Crafton
50-Jon Wood

Failed to qualify: Trevor Boys (#36), Nathal Wulff (#65), Conrad Burr (#87). Note: Trevor Boys replaced Michael Dokken in the #66 in the race.

O'Reilly Auto Parts 250

The O'Reilly Auto Parts 250 was held July 5 at Kansas Speedway. Chad Chaffin won the pole.

Top ten results

50-Jon Wood
99-Carl Edwards
46-Dennis Setzer
16-Travis Kvapil
59-Robert Pressley
03-Eric Jones
2-Jason Leffler
33-Paul Menard
62-Brendan Gaughan
8-Bill Lester

Failed to qualify: Doug Keller (#27), Aaron Daniel (#11), Wayne Edwards (#25), Bobby Dotter (#07)

Built Ford Tough 225

The Built Ford Tough 225 was held July 12 at Kentucky Speedway. Jon Wood won the pole.

Top ten results

99-Carl Edwards
1-Ted Musgrave
46-Dennis Setzer
50-Jon Wood
2-Jason Leffler
16-Travis Kvapil
88-Matt Crafton
59-Robert Pressley
29-Terry Cook
75-Hank Parker Jr.

Failed to qualify: Andy Hillenburg (#10), Blake Mallory (#36)

This was Carl Edwards' first Truck Series victory, but he suffered a 100-point penalty after the race due to cylinder head infractions.

Missouri-Illinois Dealers Ram Tough 200

The Missouri-Illinois Dealers Ram Tough 200 was held July 19 at Gateway International Raceway. Travis Kvapil won the pole.

Top ten results

62-Brendan Gaughan
2-Jason Leffler
16-Travis Kvapil
99-Carl Edwards
14-Rick Crawford
75-David Starr
1-Ted Musgrave
46-Dennis Setzer
29-Terry Cook
88-Matt Crafton

Failed to qualify: none

Sears 200

The Sears 200 was held July 26 at Michigan International Speedway. Jason Leffler won the pole.

Top ten results

62-Brendan Gaughan
1-Ted Musgrave
18-Chad Chaffin
2-Jason Leffler
99-Carl Edwards
50-Jon Wood
16-Travis Kvapil
46-Dennis Setzer
29-Terry Cook
4-Bobby Hamilton

Failed to qualify: none

Power Stroke Diesel 200

The Power Stroke Diesel 200 was held August 1 at Indianapolis Raceway Park. Terry Cook won the pole.

Top ten results

99-Carl Edwards
16-Travis Kvapil
4-Bobby Hamilton
62-Brendan Gaughan
50-Jon Wood
1-Ted Musgrave
52-Ken Schrader
46-Dennis Setzer
29-Terry Cook
88-Matt Crafton

Failed to qualify: Jason York (#93), Conrad Burr (#87), Casey Kingsland (#66), Jody McCormick (#77), Eric Jones (#03), Jay Sherston (#7), Scott Hall (#79), Doug Mahlik (#09), Ron Polodna (#13), Craig Wood (#11)

Federated Auto Parts 200

The Federated Auto Parts 200 was held August 8 at Nashville Superspeedway. Chad Chaffin won the pole.

Top ten results

99-Carl Edwards
1-Ted Musgrave
14-Rick Crawford
75-David Starr
62-Brendan Gaughan
18-Chad Chaffin
50-Jon Wood
46-Dennis Setzer
16-Travis Kvapil
88-Matt Crafton

Failed to qualify: none

O'Reilly 200 presented by Valvoline Maxlife

The O'Reilly 200 presented by Valvoline Maxlife was held August 20 at Bristol Motor Speedway. Ted Musgrave won the pole.

Top ten results

16-Travis Kvapil
59-Robert Pressley
14-Rick Crawford
62-Brendan Gaughan
46-Dennis Setzer
88-Matt Crafton
18-Chad Chaffin
50-Jon Wood
2-Jason Leffler
6-Kevin Harvick

Failed to qualify: none

Virginia Is For Lovers 200

The Virginia Is For Lovers 200 was held September 4 at Richmond International Raceway. Travis Kvapil won the pole.

Top ten results

33-Tony Stewart
59-Robert Pressley
1-Ted Musgrave
50-Jon Wood
46-Dennis Setzer
14-Rick Crawford
62-Brendan Gaughan
4-Bobby Hamilton
16-Travis Kvapil
9-Johnny Sauter

Failed to qualify: Brian Sockwell (#51)

New Hampshire 200

The New Hampshire 200 was held September 13 at New Hampshire International Speedway. Jimmy Spencer won the pole.

Top ten results

2-Jimmy Spencer
99-Carl Edwards
4-Bobby Hamilton
46-Dennis Setzer
62-Brendan Gaughan
18-Chad Chaffin
16-Travis Kvapil
75-David Starr
50-Jon Wood
88-Matt Crafton

Failed to qualify: none

This was Jimmy Spencer's only Truck Series victory.

American Racing Wheels 200

The American Racing Wheels 200 was held September 20 at California Speedway. Brendan Gaughan won the pole.

Top ten results

1-Ted Musgrave
62-Brendan Gaughan
46-Dennis Setzer
14-Rick Crawford
75-David Starr
2-Andy Houston
99-Carl Edwards
16-Travis Kvapil
50-Jon Wood
39-Jason Small

Failed to qualify: Doug Keller (#77), Blake Mallory (#27), Ricky Sanders (#19), Aaron Daniel (#93)

Las Vegas 350

The Las Vegas 350 was held September 27 at Las Vegas Motor Speedway. Brendan Gaughan won the pole.

Top ten results

62-Brendan Gaughan
75-David Starr
46-Dennis Setzer
16-Travis Kvapil
11-Jack Sprague
2-Andy Houston
29-Terry Cook
1-Ted Musgrave
88-Matt Crafton
4-Bobby Hamilton

Failed to qualify: J. C. Stout (#91), Jason Small (#39), Trevor Boys (#36), Chris Horn (#58), Kelly Sutton (#02), Conrad Burr (#94), David Gilliland (#09), Rick Bogart (#70), Loni Richardson (#0), Tina Gordon (#31), Jason York (#97), David Stover (#63), Ricky Sanders (#19), Kenny Hendrick (#9), Tim Woods (#54)

John Boy & Billy 250

The John Boy & Billy 250 was held October 4 at South Boston Speedway. Brendan Gaughan won the pole.

Top ten results

46-Dennis Setzer
16-Travis Kvapil
1-Ted Musgrave
50-Jon Wood
14-Rick Crawford
2-Andy Houston
99-Carl Edwards
4-Bobby Hamilton
75-David Starr
59-Robert Pressley

Failed to qualify: Randy Briggs (#51)

Silverado 350

The Silverado 350 was held October 11 at Texas Motor Speedway. Andy Houston won the pole.

Top ten results

62-Brendan Gaughan
16-Travis Kvapil
1-Ted Musgrave
99-Carl Edwards
2-Andy Houston
50-Jon Wood
29-Terry Cook
46-Dennis Setzer
14-Rick Crawford
4-Bobby Hamilton

Failed to qualify: Shane Wallace (#04), Loni Richardson (#0). Note: Shane Wallace replaced Jamie Aube in the #86 in the race.

Advance Auto Parts 200

The Advance Auto Parts 200 was held October 18 at Martinsville Speedway. Carl Edwards won the pole.

Top ten results

50-Jon Wood
99-Carl Edwards
46-Dennis Setzer
14-Rick Crawford
4-Bobby Hamilton
2-Jimmy Spencer
17-Darrell Waltrip
52-Ken Schrader
75-David Starr
1-Ted Musgrave

Failed to qualify: Jerry Hill (#51), Ron Polodna (#13), Wayne Edwards (#95), Jeremy Thompson (#92), Craig Wood (#73), Scotty Sands (#47). Note: Wayne Edwards replaced Dallas Norman in the #31 in the race.

Chevy Silverado 150

The Chevy Silverado 150 was held October 31 at Phoenix International Raceway. Ted Musgrave won the pole.

Top ten results

6-Kevin Harvick
1-Ted Musgrave
46-Dennis Setzer
99-Carl Edwards
4-Bobby Hamilton
75-David Starr
50-Jon Wood
59-Robert Pressley
16-Travis Kvapil
2-Andy Houston

Failed to qualify: Nathan Wulff (#65), Tim Woods (#54), Pete Harding (#36), Tommy Pistone (#28), Stan Boyd (#5), Cory Kruseman (#98)

Ford 200

The Ford 200 was held November 14 at Homestead-Miami Speedway. Bobby Hamilton won the pole.

This race saw the possibility of any one of the series' four top drivers in the points standings coming away with the championship. Going into the race Brendan Gaughan, driving the #62 Orleans Casino Dodge Ram for Orleans Racing, was leading the standings. Ted Musgrave, driving the #1 Mopar Dodge Ram for Ultra Motorsports, was sitting second. Third place was Dennis Setzer, in the #46 Acxiom Chevrolet Silverado for Morgan-Dollar Motorsports, and fourth was held by Travis Kvapil, driving the #16 IWX Motor Freight Chevrolet Silverado that Mike Bliss had won the series championship driving one year earlier for Xpress Motorsports.

Controversy was caused, however, by potential roadblocks caused by drivers' teammates. Setzer's team did not enter a second truck in the race. Kvapil's team was fielding the #11 IWX Silverado for Jack Sprague, who had joined the team after being fired by Haas CNC Racing in the Winston Cup Series. Gaughan's team was fielding the #61 Orleans Casino Ram driven by Scott Lynch, the team's developmental driver.

Ultra Motorsports, meanwhile, fielded both of their full-time trucks driven by Musgrave and Andy Houston, who drove the #2 Team ASE Ram. Tyler Walker, a developmental driver racing part time for Ultra, fielded the #7 Dodge Motorsports Ram as he had in two prior races in the truck he shared with Tracy Hines. They then drew criticism for two additional entries they prepared specifically for this race. The first truck was prepared for Marty Houston, a former Truck Series regular and brother of Andy Houston who had been on the #1’s pit crew; he drove the #10 Ram carrying the same sponsorship as his brother in his first NASCAR race of any kind since 2001. The second truck was prepared for P.J. Jones, a former IndyCar series driver who had not made a start in the Truck Series in eight years and who was largely a road course ringer; he piloted the #27 Ram sponsored by team owner Jim Smith’s company Ultra Wheels. 

Among the critics of the move was the points leader, who felt that by fielding five trucks that Smith was trying to give Musgrave an unfair advantage, especially considering that Marty Houston had not raced in over two years. Gaughan's complaints proved to be valid, as with thirty-four laps to go in the race, his day came to an end. The #62 made contact with the #10, who was running a lap down, and in the process Bryan Reffner in the #80 Emerson Electronics Ford F-150 was collected in the wreck. None of the three trucks were able to continue and the accident cost Gaughan his chance at the championship. An angry Gaughan blasted Houston for causing the accident and Smith for his tactics in an interview following the accident. 

The next contender to run into trouble was Musgrave. With two laps to go in the race, the race restarted and Musgrave attempted to make a pass on Kvapil's inside before the cars reached the start/finish line. Musgrave completed the pass and then passed Setzer, but NASCAR threw the black flag as Musgrave was judged to have been in violation of race rules. Musgrave never answered the black flag, and when the checkered flag fell on the next lap he crossed it in sixth place behind Sprague and in front of Kvapil, who passed Setzer for seventh. With the penalty, however, Musgrave was listed as the last car on the lead lap in thirteenth place.

For several minutes, NASCAR held off on making the results official as they reviewed Musgrave's penalty. After a 23-minute delay, the black flag was upheld, and Kvapil was declared the series champion. The final margin was nine points, while Musgrave finished eighteen points behind and Gaughan forty (without the black flag, Musgrave would have been the champion over Kvapil by 12 points, with Setzer 21 behind, and Gaughan 52 back).

In a post-race interview, an obviously angry Musgrave, while acknowledging his infraction, blamed it on Kvapil putting the brakes on him and responded with, "That figures. Screw them. All I can say is that next year, you're going to see a whole new Ted Musgrave. He's going to be the dirtiest son of a gun going out there on the racetrack and you might as well throw that rulebook away. I ain't going by it no more."

Xpress Motorsports won its second consecutive Truck Series Championship as a team, as Mike Bliss had won the 2002 series championship driving the same truck Kvapil took to the championship.

Polesitter Bobby Hamilton won the race. Of the additional drivers that the Xpress, Ultra, and Orleans teams entered, Jack Sprague and P. J. Jones finished in the top ten, with Sprague fifth and Jones ninth. Scott Lynch finished twelfth, Tyler Walker twenty-third, and Marty Houston thirtieth. Gaughan finished the race in twenty-ninth.

IndyCar Series driver and future Indianapolis 500 winner Buddy Rice made his NASCAR debut in this race driving SealMaster Racing's #88 Chevrolet Silverado normally driven by Matt Crafton. Crafton drove the team's #98 entry for this race. Rice would finish 20th.

Top ten results (on the track)

4-Bobby Hamilton
14-Rick Crawford
75-David Starr
2-Andy Houston
11-Jack Sprague
1-Ted Musgrave
16-Travis Kvapil
46-Dennis Setzer
50-Jon Wood
27-P. J. Jones

Top ten results (official result)

4-Bobby Hamilton
14-Rick Crawford
75-David Starr
2-Andy Houston
11-Jack Sprague
16-Travis Kvapil
46-Dennis Setzer
50-Jon Wood
27-P. J. Jones
18-Chad Chaffin

Failed to qualify: Derrike Cope (#93), Jason Hedlesky (#51), Wayne Edwards (#95), Lance Hooper (#01), Dana White (#25), Jamie Aube (#23), Carl Long (#5), Danny Bagwell (#81)

Full Drivers' Championship

(key) Bold – Pole position awarded by time. Italics – Pole position set by owner's points. * – Most laps led.

Rookie of the Year 
Gong Show winner Carl Edwards was named Rookie of the Year, winning three races and finishing eighth in points for Roush Racing. The first runner-up was Jody Lavender, who competed in 21 of 25 races for Green Light Racing. Tina Gordon, T. J. Bell and Doug Keller made limited attempts at the award, while Teri MacDonald drove part-time for her brother Randy MacDonald in the Truck Series.

See also 
 2003 NASCAR Winston Cup Series
 2003 NASCAR Busch Series

External links 
Truck Series Standings and Statistics for 2003

NASCAR Truck Series seasons